Koçkar can refer to:

 Koçkar, Kemah
 Koçkar, Kulp